Football Club Sochaux-Montbéliard (commonly referred to as FCSM or simply Sochaux) is a French association football club based in the city of Montbéliard. The club was founded in 1928 and currently plays in Ligue 2, the second tier of French football, after having finished 18th and being relegated from Ligue 1 in the 2013–14 season. Sochaux plays its home matches at the Stade Auguste Bonal, located within the city.

Sochaux was founded by Jean-Pierre Peugeot, a prominent member of the Peugeot family, and is one of the founding members of the first division of French football. The club has won both Ligue 1 and the Coupe de France twice and have also won the Coupe de la Ligue. Sochaux's last honour came in 2007 when the club, under the guidance of Alain Perrin, defeated favourites Marseille 5–4 on penalties in the 2007 Coupe de France Final. Sochaux's colours are gold and navy blue.

Sochaux is known for its youth academy, which has regularly finished in the top ten rankings of youth academies in France (fourth in 2010). The most successful team in the academy is the under-19 team, which has won the Coupe Gambardella twice, in 1973 and 2007. In 2010, Sochaux finished runners-up to Metz in the 2010 edition of the competition. The academy has produced several notable talents, such as Yannick Stopyra, El-Hadji Diouf, Jérémy Ménez, Bernard Genghini and Benoît Pedretti, among others. The club were a regular in the top flight, until relegation in 2014. Sochaux has since competed in Ligue 2

History
Football Club Sochaux-Montbéliard was founded in 1928 under the name Football Club Sochaux by Jean-Pierre Peugeot, a director of Peugeot, a French car manufacturing company. Peugeot sought to create a football club for the leisure time of the company's workers. He installed Louis Maillard-Salin as the club's first president, and made Maurice Bailly the club's first manager. Bailly was also a member of the team. Sochaux played its first match on 2 September 1928 against the reserve team of local club AS Montbéliard. The club was inserted into the lowest level of league football in the Franche-Comté region and played its first league match three weeks later winning 12–1.

Peugeot was among the first to advocate for the professionalisation of French football and, in 1929, went as far as to admit to paying his players, which was strictly forbidden during this time. The subsequent recruitment of several French internationals and players from abroad led to Sochaux gaining a stranglehold on the region easily disposing of local rivals AS Montbéliard and AS Valentigney. In June 1930, Montbéliard decided to merge with Sochaux to form the club that exists today. The following month, the National Council of the French Football Federation voted 128–20 in support of professionalism in French football. With Peugeot being a strong advocate for professionalism, Sochaux were among the first clubs to adopt the new statute and, subsequently, became professional. In the league's inaugural season, Sochaux finished 3rd in its group. The club's final position was later moved to 2nd after Antibes, the champions of the group, was disqualified from the league for suspected bribery.

In the 1934–35 season, Sochaux captured its first league title finishing one point ahead of Strasbourg. Led by Uruguayan manager Conrad Ross, as well as captain Étienne Mattler, known as Le Lion de Belfort, and strikers Roger Courtois and Bernard Williams, Sochaux dominated the league losing only four times. Two seasons later, the same team, with the addition of goalkeeper Laurent Di Lorto and the Swiss duo of André Abegglen and Maxime Lehmann, Sochaux won its first Coupe de France title. The club faced league rivals Strasbourg in the final and defeated the Alsatians 2–1 courtesy of goals from Williams and the Argentine Miguel Angel Lauri. Ross finished his career at Sochaux by winning another league title in 1938. After the 1938–39 season, Ross and several players departed the club to play and manage abroad due to the onset of World War II. The non-deserters were, subsequently, called into action to fight with the French Army, which ultimately caused the club to limit its aspiring ambitions.

During war-time, in an effort to survive financially, Sochaux formed an interim merger with local rivals AS Valentigney. The club, known as FC Sochaux-Valentigney, participated in the war-time championships from 1942 to 1944. Following the conclusion of the war, Sochaux dissolved the merger, turn professional again, and returned to its original name. The club, however, failed to get back to its form prior to the war and, subsequently, made the decision to forgo entering bidding wars for players, which was becoming the norm and, instead, focus on keeping the team's budget even. As a result, in the first season after the war, Sochaux suffered relegation after finishing in last place with only 15 points. Sochaux spent only one season in the second division and returned to Division 1 for the 1947–48 season. The club spent the next 13 seasons playing in Division 1 with its best finish coming during the 1952–53 season when the club finished runner-up to champions Stade Reims. In the same season, Sochaux won its first honour since 1938 after winning the Coupe Charles Drago. In 1959, the club returned to the Coupe de France final, however, the outcome was not in Sochaux's favour, with the club losing 3–0 to Le Havre in a replay after a 2–2 draw.

In the early 1960s, despite playing in Division 2, Sochaux won the Coupe Drago in back-to-back seasons. The club made its return to Division 1 in 1964, and remained in the league for over 20 years, regularly finishing in the top ten before falling down to Division 2 in the 1987–88 season. During Sochaux's 24-year run in the first division, the club played in European competitions four times. In the 1980–81 season, Sochaux surprised many by reaching the semi-finals of the UEFA Cup. In the round, the club was defeated by Dutch club AZ 4–3 on aggregate. The club's successful play during this stint was predominantly due to the creation of the club's academy in 1974, which paid immediate dividends. Player such as Bernard Genghini, Yannick Stopyra, Joël Bats and Philippe Anziani were among the inaugural graduates who were instrumental in Sochaux's domestic success.

After hovering between the first division and the second division in the 1990s, Sochaux returned to the first division, now called Ligue 1, at the start of the new millennium. The club surprised many by finishing in the top ten in its first three seasons back. Also included in that three-year run was an appearance in the Coupe de la Ligue final and, in the ensuing year, a league cup title. In the 2003 final, Sochaux, led by manager Guy Lacombe and academy graduates Pierre-Alain Frau, Jérémy Mathieu, and Benoît Pedretti, were defeated 4–1 by Monaco. In the following season, a more experienced Sochaux returned to the final, where the club faced Nantes. Sochaux defeated Nantes 5–4 on penalties to win its first major title since winning the Coupe Drago 40 years previously. It did not take the club another 40 years to claim its next title as Sochaux were surprise winners of the Coupe de France in the 2006–07 season after defeating Marseille on penalties. Marseille were heavy favourites heading into match, mainly due to its 4–2 thrashing of Sochaux just 12 days before. However, Sochaux, led by Alain Perrin, stunned the nation and claimed its first Coupe de France title since 1937.

In July 2015, Peugeot sold the team to Hong Kong company Ledus. In 2018 it was announced that Spanish club Alaves (whose owners had a stake in Ledus) was starting a partnership with Sochaux; however the agreement lasted only a few months, ending abruptly in December of the same year.

With Omar Daf as coach, FCSM win the last game of season against Grenoble Foot 38 and save his Ligue 2 place. Club finish 16th in Ligue 2 but is demoted to National by the DNCG (National Directorate of Management Control), for not having presented balanced accounts.

Chinese real estate group Nenking, who unofficially take the reins of the club, following the economic problems encountered by Tech Pro, inject money into the coffers to save him from relegation. Nenking also appoint Samuel Laurent to the position of general director.

In April 2020, the Football Club Sochaux-Montbéliard SASP (Société Anonyme Sportive Professionnelle) officially became the property of the Nenking Group. "This sale to the group whose founding president is Mr. Zhong Naixiong comes in accordance with the agreements previously made with Ledus"  and Frankie Yau become president.

Stadium

Sochaux plays its home matches at the Stade Auguste Bonal in Montbéliard. The stadium was constructed in 1931 and opened on 11 November of that same year. The facility was previously known as Stade de la Forge. In July 1945, the club changed the stadium's name to its current version. It is named after Auguste Bonal, the former sports director of the club, who after refusing to co-operate with the Germans during World War II, was murdered.

The Stade Auguste Bonal has undergone renovations twice: in 1973 and 1997. In 1997, the majority of the stadium was completely overhauled, and practically a new stadium was built. The stadium still hosted matches during the renovation period, but with a limited capacity. The renovation cost ₣114 million, and took nearly three years to complete. The Nouveau Bonal was officially inaugurated on 22 July 2000 in a Trophée des champions match between FC Nantes and AS Monaco. The stadium's current capacity is 20,005.

Players

Current squad

Out on loan

Notable former players
Below are the notable former players who have represented Sochaux in league and international competition since the club's foundation in 1928. To appear in the section below, a player must have played in at least 200 official matches for the club.

For a complete list of Sochaux players, see :Category:FC Sochaux-Montbéliard players

 Cedric Bakambu
 Philippe Anziani
 Eugène Battmann
 Olivier Baudry
 Mehmed Baždarević
 Éric Benoît
 Serge Bourdoncle
 Roger Courtois
 Laurent Croci
 Omar Daf
 Abdel Djaadaoui
 Thierry Fernier
 Maxence Flachez
 Pierre-Alain Frau
 René Gardien
 Bernard Genghini
 Faruk Hadžibegić
 Fabrice Henry
 Michaël Isabey
 Zvonko Ivezić
 Pierre Lechantre
 Philippe Lucas
 Erwan Manac'h
 Bernard Maraval 
 Jérémy Mathieu 
 Vojislav Melić
 Jérémy Ménez
 Miranda
 Stéphane Paille
 Benoît Pedretti
 Ivan Perisic
 Romain Pitau
 Jean-Pierre Posca
 Claude Quittet
 Albert Rust
 Jean-Luc Ruty
 Adolphe Schmit
 Laszlo Seleš
 Franck Silvestre
 Yannick Stopyra
 Joseph Tellechéa
 Jean-Christophe Thomas
 Marcel Wassmer

Honours

Domestic
Ligue 1
Champions: 1934–35, 1937–38
Ligue 2
Champions: 1946–47, 1987–88 , 2000–01 
Coupe de France
Champions: 1936–37, 2006–07
Runners-up: 1958–59, 1966–67, 1987–88
Coupe de la Ligue
Champions: 2003–04
Runners-up: 2002–03
Trophée des Champions
Runners-up: 2007
Coupe Gambardella
Champions: 1983, 2007, 2015
Runners-up: 1975, 2010

Other
Coupe Charles Drago
Champions (3): 1953, 1963, 1964
Coupe Peugeot
Champions (1): 1931
Coupe Mohamed V
Champions (1): 1989
Joan Gamper Trophy
Runners-up (1): 1989

Management and staff
Senior club staff
President: Frédéric Dong Bo

Coaching staff
Manager: Olivier Guégan
Assistant coaches: Ali Boumnijel and Stéphane Mangione
Goalkeeping coach: Gérard Gnanhouan

Managerial history

See also
Works team

References

External links

 
Montbéliard
Association football clubs established in 1928
1928 establishments in France
Sport in Doubs
Peugeot
Sochaux-Montbéliard
Football clubs in Bourgogne-Franche-Comté
Ligue 1 clubs